Federal Route 19 is a federal road in the state of Malacca, Malaysia. The road connects Kampung Ulu Kendong in Negeri Sembilan to Malacca Town.

Route background
The Kilometre Zero of the Federal Route 19 starts at Kampung Ulu Kendong at Negeri Sembilan–Melaka state border.

History
The road used to be the main railway line of Kemus–Malacca. The railway line was dismantled in 1942, following the Japanese occupation. In 2004, about 80% of the route from Melaka city to Simpang Ampat (including Melaka Bypass and Alor Gajah Bypass) was upgraded to a dual-carriageway known as Lebuh AMJ (Federal Route 19).

Features
At most sections, the Federal Route 19 was built under the JKR R5 road standard as a dual-carriageway highway (except Kg. Gajah Mati–Alor Gajah–Kg. Melekek section and Taboh Naning–Ulu Kendong section) with partial access control, with a speed limit of 90 km/h.

There is one overlap: Bulatan Taboh Naning–Kampung Melekek, Kampung Gajah Mati–Malim Jaya (overlaps with 19 Lebuh AMJ).

There are no alternate routes or sections with motorcycle lanes.

List of junctions and towns

References

Malaysian Federal Roads
Lebuh AMJ